Reber is a village in the Municipality of Žužemberk in southeastern Slovenia. The area is part of the historical region of Lower Carniola. The municipality is now included in the Southeast Slovenia Statistical Region. 

The local church is dedicated to Mary Magdalene and belongs to the Parish of Žužemberk. It is a medieval building that was heavily damaged in bombing during the Second World War and only hastily repaired.

References

External links
Reber at Geopedia

Populated places in the Municipality of Žužemberk